The 2000–01 BYU Cougars men's basketball team represented Brigham Young University in the 2000–01 season. Led by head coach Steve Cleveland, the Cougars earned their first Mountain West Conference championship. This was also their first of three eventual NCAA Tournament appearances under Cleveland. This was also the Cougars' first tournament appearance since 1995.

Roster

Tournament schedule
Mountain West Tournament
First round Vs. Air Force, Thomas and Mack Center, Las Vegas, NV - W, 69-54
Semifinal Vs. Wyoming, Thomas and Mack Center, Las Vegas, NV - W, 77-66
Final Vs. New Mexico, Thomas and Mack Center, Las Vegas, NV - W, 69-65
NCAA Tournament
First Round Vs. Cincinnati, Cox Arena, San Diego, CA - L, 59-84

References

BYU Cougars men's basketball seasons
Byu
Byu